724 Squadron was a Royal Navy Fleet Air Arm and Royal Australian Navy Fleet Air Arm flying squadron. The squadron was formed for the first time in 1945 and was last disbanded in 1984.

History

724 Squadron was first formed on 10 April 1945 as a Royal Navy naval air communications unit. The squadron made daily flights between Sydney and Melbourne until 31 May 1946 when it was disbanded.

724 Squadron was recommissioned as an Australian unit on 1 June 1955 at the Royal Australian Navy's (RAN) main air station HMAS Albatross. The squadron's role was to carry out fixed-wing conversion training and it was initially equipped with Wirraway, Hawker Sea Fury and Fairey Firefly propeller-driven aircraft and de Havilland Vampire jets.

The squadron's role changed in October 1956 when it absorbed most of the decommissioned 723 Squadron's de Havilland Sea Venom fighters and Fairey Gannet anti-submarine aircraft and Bristol Sycamore helicopters. As part of this change 724 Squadron's Wirraways, Sea Furies and Fireflys were transferred to other units. In its new role the squadron provided Sea Venom and Gannet operational training on board the RAN's only aircraft carrier, HMAS Melbourne. Three 724 Squadron pilots were killed during separate flying accidents during 1956.

724 Squadron's make-up continued to change in 1957 and 1958. The Sycamores were transferred back to the recommissioned 723 Squadron in early 1957 and the Gannets moved to 725 Squadron during 1958. This left 724 Squadron equipped with Sea Vampires and Sea Venoms. In 1959 the squadron formed an aerobatic team called the Ramjets which was equipped with Sea Venoms and performed at air shows across Australia.

The squadron's role and aircraft inventory expanded during the early 1960s as the RAN wound-down its fixed-wing aircraft operations. 724 Squadron absorbed 725 Squadron in June 1961 and 805 Squadron and 723 Squadron in June and November 1963 respectively. As a result of these changes the squadron's aircraft complement eventually included Sea Venoms, Gannets, Vampires, Fireflies, Dakotas and Autocars. Between 1963 and 1968 724 Squadron and 816 Squadron were the only FAA squadrons operating fixed-wing aircraft. During this time the squadron's roles included all-weather fighter, anti-submarine warfare and operational flying training along with fleet support, trials and communications tasks.

724 Squadron became an all-jet conversion training squadron again in December 1968 and was equipped with two-seat trainer variants of the new McDonnell Douglas A-4G Skyhawk, Vampires and Venoms. The Vampires and Venoms were replaced by new Aermacchi MB-326 trainers between 1970 and 1972. Despite its rating as a second-line training unit, 724 Squadron participated in some fleet exercises and used its Skyhawks to provide close air support to Australian Army units during ground manoeuvres.

The squadron's Skyhawks were also used in a new aerobatic team called the Checkmates.
In June 1982 HMAS Melbourne was decommissioned without being replaced. As a result, the RAN's fixed-wing aircraft squadrons were rapidly decommissioned. 724 Squadron absorbed 805 Squadron's Skyhawks in July 1982 and transferred its Macchis to the Royal Australian Air Force in 1983. The squadron was decommissioned at HMAS Albatross on 30 June 1984 and its Skyhawks were later sold to the Royal New Zealand Air Force.

Notes

The "Checkmates" were an aerobatic team operated by 805 Sqn (VS 805) which was the front line Skyhawk sqn. Aircraft on this team at one stage sported a chess knight logo on the tailfin instead of the red/white check pattern. (The aircraft of 724 sported a similar pattern but in blue/yellow

References
 

Flying squadrons of the Royal Australian Navy
700 series Fleet Air Arm squadrons
Military units and formations established in 1945
Military units and formations disestablished in 1984